Kuttu may refer to:
Kuttu flour, a buckwheat or grass seed flour
Chakyar koothu, a south Indian performance art
Kuttu, a western islet in Chuuk State, Micronesia